Robert Dale Springer (January 17, 1933 – August 19, 2021) was a lieutenant general in the United States Air Force who served as vice commander in chief, Military Airlift Command from 1987 to 1988 and Inspector General of the Air Force from 1985 to 1987.

References

1933 births
2021 deaths
United States Air Force generals
People from Centre County, Pennsylvania
Burials at Arlington National Cemetery
Military personnel from Pennsylvania